Whitehorn Mountain is located in the Slate Range of Banff National Park in Alberta, Canada.

Geology

Like other mountains in Banff Park, Whitehorn is composed of sedimentary rock laid down from the Precambrian to Jurassic periods. Formed in shallow seas, this sedimentary rock was pushed east and over the top of younger rock during the Laramide orogeny.

Climate

Based on the Köppen climate classification, Whitehorn is located in a subarctic climate zone with cold, snowy winters, and mild summers.

See also
 List of mountains of Canada

References

External links
 National Park Service web site: Banff National Park

 Whitehorn Mountain weather: Mountain Forecast

Whitehorn Mountain
Whitehorn Mountain